MCGS Barracuda is a Kora-Class offshore patrol vessel of National Coast Guard Mauritius. Built by Garden Reach Shipbuilders and Engineers, Kolkata, India and launched on 2 August 2013, it is the first warship to be exported by an Indian shipyard.

History 
India and Mauritius concluded a contract on the purchase of MCGS Barracuda in March 2011. The ship was to have been built in 42 months and was delivered to The Mauritian Coast Guard in September 2014 on the sidelines of Prime Minister Narendra Modi's state visit to Mauritius. Its keel was laid in April 2012 and was launched on 2 August 2013.

Features 
Valued at US$50 million, MCGS Barracuda has an integrated bridge system and advanced controls and main engines. Armed with a 30 mm gun featuring a stabilised optical remote control system, Barracuda also carries heavy machine-guns (HMGs) and medium machine-guns (MMGs) to deal with hostile situations. Manned by a crew of 83 officers and men, Barracuda can be deployed for a wide range of tasks including anti-piracy, search and rescue, anti-smuggling and anti-drug surveillance operations. The ship will safeguard the exclusive economic zone of Mauritius and can be used as a logistics support vessel and to transport troops. Barracuda is also capable of supporting helicopter operations without a hangar.

References

Ships built in India
Ships built in Kolkata
2013 ships
National Coast Guard of Mauritius